Giuseppe Soleri (born May 10, 1982 in Rome) is an Italian television actor.

Biography
He began to acting in 2004 with the Television Crime mini-series La omicidi. Soleri started his cinema acting with Action Comedy film The 17th Floor and worked besides as producer on them. Among his roles is that of Gargiulo in the L'ispettore Coliandro series. Soleri starred also in the Television films The murders and the five Days of Milan. Soleri has also starred in the Crime-Drama TV series Carabinieri 7. He acted 2008 also in the black and white Drama film Altromondo and the Television miniseries Mal'aria.

Personal life
He is the son of journalist and RAI manager Agostino Saccà.

Filmography

Television

References

External links
 

1982 births
Living people
Italian film producers
Male actors from Rome
Italian male film actors
People of Calabrian descent